The 2005 Advanta Championships was a women's tennis tournament played on indoor hard courts at The Pavilion in Villanova, Philadelphia, Pennsylvania in the United States that was part of Tier II of the 2005 WTA Tour. It was the 21st and last edition of the tournament and was held from October 31 through November 6, 2005. Third-seeded Amélie Mauresmo won her third consecutive singles title and earned $93,000 first-prize money.

Finals

Singles
 Amélie Mauresmo defeated  Elena Dementieva 7–5, 2–6, 7–5
 It was Mauresmo's 4th singles title of the year and the 18th of her career.

Doubles
 Cara Black /  Rennae Stubbs defeated  Lisa Raymond /  Samantha Stosur 6–4, 7–6(7–4)

References

External links
 ITF tournament edition details
 Tournament draws

Advanta Championships of Philadelphia
Advanta Championships of Philadelphia
Advanta Championships
Advanta Championships
Advanta Championships
Advanta Championships